Edward Hoyte Lyons (May 12, 1923 – January 25, 2009), nicknamed "Mouse", was a Major League Baseball second baseman who played for the Washington Senators in .

Born in Winston-Salem, North Carolina, Lyons signed a contract out of high school with the Washington Senators when he was 17. While in the minor leagues, his baseball career was interrupted by World War II when he joined the United States Navy. He made his Major League debut with the Washington Senators in 1947. He played 7 games at second base and hit .154 in his only season in the Major Leagues. When his playing career ended he became a manager for the Senators, Red Sox, and Cardinals organizations. He was inducted into the Winston-Salem Baseball Hall of Fame in 1998. After his retirement, he resided in Clemmons, North Carolina and died on January 25, 2009, in Winston-Salem.

References

External links
Baseball Reference

1923 births
2009 deaths
Washington Senators (1901–1960) players
Baseball players from Winston-Salem, North Carolina
Major League Baseball second basemen
Minnesota Twins coaches
Chicago Cubs scouts
Montreal Expos scouts
St. Louis Cardinals scouts
Charlotte Hornets (baseball) players
Chattanooga Lookouts players
Billings Mustangs managers
Birmingham Barons players
Louisville Colonels (minor league) players
Columbus Red Birds players
Fresno Cardinals players
Billings Mustangs players
York White Roses players
Concord Weavers players
United States Navy personnel of World War II